The 2002 Haarlem Baseball Week was an international baseball competition held at the Pim Mulier Stadium in Haarlem, the Netherlands from July 19–28, 2002. It was the 21st edition of the tournament and featured teams from Chinese Taipei, Cuba, Japan, Netherlands, South Africa and United States.

In the end, the team from the United States won their second straight and third tournament as the national team.

Group stage

Standings

 Chinese Taipei is the official IBAF designation for the team representing the state officially referred to as the Republic of China, more commonly known as Taiwan. (See also political status of Taiwan for details.)

Game results

 Regarding a friendly match, the results didn't affect the standings.

Final

Final standings

Tournament awards

External links
Official Website
Game Results

References

2002 in baseball